is a series of fighting games created by Hudson Soft, and developed together with Eighting. The series has been published by multiple companies, including Virgin Interactive, Activision, and Konami. Konami holds the rights to the franchise after Hudson Soft was absorbed into the former company in 2012.

The series began in 1997 under the name Beastorizer. The game's theme incorporated anthropomorphism, where the player has the ability to transform into a half-human, half-animal creature known as a Zoanthrope (the name came from the clinical term, 'zoanthropy', which is similar to that of lycanthropy). The game would appear under the name "Bloody Roar" when ported to the PlayStation in 1998, which would become the permanent title thereafter.

Games

Gameplay
Bloody Roar has kept somewhat the same controls over the series. A button each for both punch and kick, the beast (transform/attack) button and a fourth button that has been either a throw button, a block button, an evade button (introduced for some characters in Bloody Roar 4) and a rave button (an early version of the Hyper Beast in the original Bloody Roar only).

The Bloody Roar series is a 3D fighting game in the same vein as Tekken, Dead or Alive, Soulcalibur and  Virtua Fighter. Although some of the characters have remained almost identical through all four games, others have changed completely. For example, Yugo has a completely different move set in the fourth title compared to his original in the first and Bakuryu has stayed almost the same apart from a few extras which are relevant to the games' evolution over time and generations.

 in Bloody Roar have command moves and standard moves. Standard moves are the combination style moves from games such as Tekken, where the player must press different buttons to create "combos", sometimes pressing the directional pad in one of the eight directions at the same time. Command moves are special moves that require a rolling technique and inputting certain commands with the directional pad, like Street Fighter. Each character has around fourteen "suggested" combination techniques listed in the manual, most of these can be varied into many different ways, allowing nearly forty to seventy combination techniques with each character. Every character also comes with at least eight command moves, which can be incorporated into cancel points in these standard moves or combos. These cancel points, from character to character, can be around twenty to forty in each character's combo palette. These cancel points, when utilized with command moves, can then be cancelled once more, allowing the player to begin a new strategy with adequate timing. As well as this, the combat system has three types of dodging techniques: a heavy and light block that spans over three parts of the body, instead of the typical two in most fighting games; and "Scratch" techniques, which can break guards from dead angles and is a series of command counters, throws and vanishing attacks. Bloody Roar 4, the latest game in the series, may be the most complex of the series, with the largest fighter roster of seventeen characters, and the ability to earn more moves by earning experience in "Career Mode".

Characters in the Bloody Roar series include: 
 Introduced in Bloody Roar: Yūgo, Alice, Long, Gado, Bakuryu (Ryūzō), Fox, Mitsuko, Greg, Uriko
 Introduced in Bloody Roar II: Stun, Shina, Jenny, Busuzima, Bakuryu (Kenji/Kakeru), Shenlong
 Introduced in Bloody Roar 3: Xion, Uranus, Kohryu
 Introduced in Bloody Roar Primal Fury/Extreme: Cronos, Ganesha, Fang
 Introduced in Bloody Roar 4: Nagi, Reiji, Mana, Ryōhō

Other media
Bloody Roar was adapted into a manga drawn by Maruyama Tomowo. It was originally published in Monthly Shōnen Jump. A few themes were used from the games but the scenarios and characters in Maruyama's version were completely new, though a few of his characters looked a lot like the original game characters. The main stars of the manga were a loner wolf zoanthrope, Fang, and a rabbit girl named Mashiro. Their adventures had them fighting out-of-control beast men and trying to stop an evil creature being released by the gathering of talismans. The manga was released in two volumes during 2001.

In the first three games, artwork by artist Naochika Morishita, also known as CARAMEL MAMA, was used for concept artwork and in game cut scenes.

For their 2000 single "My Console", the Italian eurodance group Eiffel 65 include Bloody Roar along with several other popular PlayStation titles in the song's lyrics.

Yūgo appears as a playable character in the 2003 crossover fighting game DreamMix TV World Fighters.

References

External links
Eighting site

 
Video games about ninja
Video games about shapeshifting
Fighting games
Video game franchises
Konami franchises
Video game franchises introduced in 1997